The masseteric artery is small and passes laterally through the mandibular notch to the deep surface of the masseter muscle, which it supplies.

It anastomoses with the masseteric branches of the external maxillary artery and with the transverse facial artery.

See also
 Masseteric nerve

References 

Arteries of the head and neck